Killbuck Township is one of the fourteen townships of Holmes County, Ohio, United States. As of the 2010 census the population was 1,982, of whom 1,165 lived in the unincorporated portion of the township.

Geography
Located in the southern part of the county, it borders the following townships:
Hardy Township - northeast
Mechanic Township - east
Clark Township, Coshocton County - southeast
Monroe Township, Coshocton County - southwest
Richland Township - west
Monroe Township - northwest

The village of Killbuck is located in central Killbuck Township.

Name and history
It is the only Killbuck Township statewide.

Government
The township is governed by a three-member board of trustees, who are elected in November of odd-numbered years to a four-year term beginning on the following January 1. Two are elected in the year after the presidential election and one is elected in the year before it. There is also an elected township fiscal officer, who serves a four-year term beginning on April 1 of the year after the election, which is held in November of the year before the presidential election. Vacancies in the fiscal officership or on the board of trustees are filled by the remaining trustees.

References

External links
County website

Townships in Holmes County, Ohio
Townships in Ohio